Hull 802 (possibly MV Claymore) is a dual-fuel car and passenger ferry for Caledonian MacBrayne, currently under construction at Ferguson Marine (Port Glasgow) Ltd. in Port Glasgow on the River Clyde.

History
A name has not yet been chosen for Hull 802. The name Claymore has been used in media coverage and recalls several previous west coast ferries.

Hull 802 will be the second of two Scottish ferries capable of operating on either marine diesel oil or liquefied natural gas (LNG), aiming at benefits of a marked reduction in carbon dioxide, sulphur and nitrous oxide emissions.

The first steel for both ships was cut on 7 April 2016.

The first ship, was launched on 21 November 2017 by the First Minister Nicola Sturgeon.

At the start of September 2021, installation of the bulbous bow, as well as stern sections, was reported as marking significant progress.

Service
Hull 802 was expected to be launched in 2018, and to enter service on the Uig Triangle the following year. However, along with her sister ship, Hull 802 has been the subject of increased costs and lengthy delays to her construction. Following delays to both ships and nationalisation of the shipyard, the second ferry was estimated in December 2019 to be delivered to CMAL in summer 2022. There were delays due to the pandemic and shortages of skilled labour, and in June 2021 delivery of Hull 802 was rescheduled for April 2023 to July 2023. Further delays in early 2022 saw the delivery date slip to October–December 2023. The ship's delivery date was delayed again in September 2022 to the first quarter of 2024, with uncertainnly where she will be deployed after delivery of further large vessels.

References

2018 ships
Caledonian MacBrayne
Ships built on the River Clyde